Number One Fan may refer to:

 Number One Fan (band), a rock band based in Appleton, Wisconsin
 Number One Fan (film), a 2014 French comedy-drama film
 "Number One Fan", song by Muna from the album Saves the World
 "#1 Fan", song by LL Cool J from the album Todd Smith

See also
 Fan (person)
 Superfan (disambiguation)